David Linx (born 22 March 1965) is a Belgian jazz singer and songwriter.

Discography

As leader
 Hungry Voices with Roy Ayers, Bashiri Johnson, Brenda White King, Nicolas Fiszman, Philippe Allard, Philippe Decock, Kevin Mulligan,… (Miracle, 1988)
 A Lover’s Question with James Baldwin, Pierre Van Dormael, Steve Coleman, Slide Hampton, Toots Thielemans, … (Crepuscule, 1990/re-released in 1999 by Label Bleu-Harmonia Mundi)
 Where Rivers Join (September, 1990)
 Moon to Your Sun (Crepuscule, 1991)
 Encores, a compilation (BMR, 1995)
 Standards with Nathalie Loriers, Nic Thys and Hans Van Oosterhout BMR, 1996)
 L'Instant D'Apres with Marc Ribot, Kevin Breit,… produced by Craig Street (Polydor/Universal, 2001) 
 Changing Faces with the Brussels Jazz Orchestra and guests: Natalie Dessay, Ivan Lins, Minino Garay, Manu Codjia, Maria Joao(O+ Music/Harmonia Mundi, 2007)
 Follow the Songlines with Maria Joao, Diederik Wissels, Mario Laginha, Helge Andreas Norbakken, Christophe Wallemme and the Porto National Symphony Orchestra conducted by Dirk Brossé (Naive, 2010)
 Rock My Boat with Rhoda Scott, André Ceccarelli, Lenine, Paolo Fresu, Julien Lourau, Laurent Cugny, Nguyên Lê, Christophe Wallemme, … (Naive, 2011)
 A Different Porgy and Another Bess with Maria Joao and the Brussels Jazz Orchestra (Naive, 2012)
 a NOUsGARO, Inédits et Incontournables with André Ceccarelli, Pierre-Alain Goualch, Diego Imbert and Marlon Moore (Just Looking, 2013)
 Brel with the Brussels Jazz Orchestra (Jazz Village/Pias, 2016)
 7000 Miles (Sound Surveyor, 2017)
 The Wordsmith with Michel Hatzigeorgiou (Sound Surveyor, 2018)
 Skin In The Game with Grégory Privat, Chris Jennings, Arnaud Dolmen, Manu Codjia and Marlon Moore (Cristal Records/Sony Music Entertainment, 2020)

With Diederik Wissels 
 Kamook (Fever Music, 1992)
 If One More Day (Crepuscule, 1993)
 Up Close (Label Bleu, 1995)
 Bandarkah (Label Bleu, 1998)
 Heartland (EmArcy/Universal, 2001)
 This Time (Le Chant du Monde, 2003)
 One Heart Three Voices (E-motive, 2005)
 Winds of Change (Just Looking, 2013)
 The Whistleblowers with Paolo Fresu (Tuk, 2015)

As guest
 Andre Ceccarelli, Le Coq et La Pendule (Plus Loin, 2009)
 Laurent Cugny, A Personal Landscape: Lumiere (Universal, 2001)
 Laurent Cugny, La Tectonique Des Nuages (France Music/Yakprod, 2010)
 Claude Nougaro, La Note Bleue (Blue Note, 2004)
 Diederik Wissels, The Hillock Songstress (Igloo/Sowarex, 1995)
 Diederik Wissels, From This Day Forward (Igloo/Sowarex, 1996)
 Wise, Metrophone (Melius Prod, 2006)
 David Chevalier, Is That Pop Music?? (Cristal Records, 2013)
 Daniel Goyone

References

External links 

1965 births
Living people
Belgian jazz singers
Musicians from Brussels
Academic staff of the Royal Conservatory of Brussels
Chevaliers of the Ordre des Arts et des Lettres
Knights of the Order of the Crown (Belgium)